The 1898–99 Football League season was Aston Villa's 11th season in the Football League First Division, the top flight of English football.

Season highlights

Three of Villa’s 1897 double-winning team joined Celtic in the summer of 1897, so 1897/98 proved to be a rebuilding period for the club. By the mid-point of 1898/99, Villa had a narrow lead over Everton and Burnley but a late season run by Liverpool dropped them to second place. It came down to ‘last-game decider’, with Villa at home to Liverpool. 41,000
spectators shoe-horned themselves into Villa Park to see an emphatic win by the home team, 5–0.

The season was notable for one of those one-off, never repeated events that enliven League history. The referee was late arriving for the match at Sheffield Wednesday. After some deliberation, it was decided to start without him. Though he took over at half-time, the delay meant that darkness fell with 10 minutes left to play. Wednesday were the better team on the day and led 3–1 at the time. The League consulted the rule-book and decided that the last 10 minutes would have to be played at a later date. The first suggestion was that perhaps the 10 minutes could be played before the return game at Villa Park. In the end, Villa agreed to play Wednesday in a benefit match for one of their players, and the missing minutes were duly played out before the friendly game. Villa made one change for the second game, Garraty replacing Bedingfield.

Villa competed in the 1899 Sheriff of London Charity Shield.

Final league position

Trivia
Ever-present: Tommy Bowman 

First at top: 29 October

Date won league: 29 April (last game)

Players used: 23

External links
AVFC History 1898–99 season

Aston Villa F.C. seasons
1899